Kajioka is a Japanese surname. Notable people with the surname include:

, Japanese actor and producer
, Imperial Japanese Navy admiral

Japanese-language surnames